Mezalocha is a municipality in the province of Zaragoza, Aragon, Spain. According to the 2004 census (INE), the municipality has 285 inhabitants.

It is located near Muel town.

References

Municipalities in the Province of Zaragoza